The Armenian Catholic Archeparchy of Aleppo (or Halab or Beroea) (informally Aleppo if the Armenians) is a non-Metropolitan Archeparchy (Eastern Catholic Archdiocese) of the Armenian Catholic Church sui iuris (Armenian Rite in Armenian language) in part of Syria.

It is directly dependent on the Armenian Catholic Patriarch of Cilicia, without being part of his or any other ecclesiastical province.

Its cathedral archiepiscopal see is the Marian Notre-Dame des Dons Armenian Catholic Cathedral, in Halab (Aleppo), Syria.

History 
 Established in 1710 as Eparchy of Aleppo (Diocese of Halab / Beroea)
 Promoted on 3 February 1899.03 as Archeparchy of Aleppo (Archdiocese).

Episcopal ordinaries
(incomplete : first centuries unavailable ; all Armenian Rite)

Eparchs (Bishops) of Aleppo
(unavailable)

Archeparchs (Archbishops) of Aleppo
 Agostino Sayeghian (1902.07.06 – death 1926.10.01)
 Giorgio Kortikian (1928.01.31 – death 1933.08.01)
 Louis Batanian (1952.12.06 – 1959.04.24); previously Archeparch of Mardin of the Armenians (1933.08.05 – 1940.08.10), Titular Archbishop of Gabula (1940.08.10 – 1952.12.06); later Titular Archbishop of Colonia in Armenia of the Armenians (1959.04.24 – 1962.09.04) & Auxiliary Eparch of the patriarchate Cilicia of the Armenians (Lebanon) (1959.04.24 – 1962.09.04), elected Patriarch of Cilicia of the Armenians (Lebanon) ([1962.09.04] 1962.11.15 – death 1976.04.22), President of Synod of the Armenian Catholic Church (1969 – 1976.04.22)
 Georges Layek (1959.08.26 – death 1983.04.15)
 Joseph Basmadjan (1984.07.04 – death 1988.12.11)
 Boutros Marayati (1989.08.21 – ...); also Apostolic Administrator of Kameshli of the Armenians (Syria) (1992 – ...)

See also 
 Catholic Church in Syria

References

External links 
 GCatholic, with titular incumbent biography links

1710 establishments in Asia
Armenian Catholic eparchies
Armenian Catholic Church in Syria